Eugene "Gene" Bilbrew (June 29, 1923 – May 1974) was an African-American vocal group singer, cartoonist, and "bizarre art" pioneer. As noted in the biography, GENE BILBREW REVEALED: The Unsung Legacy of a Fetish Art Pioneer, he was "the first black career fetish artist in history." Starting in the mid-1950s, he was among the most prolific illustrators of fetish-oriented pulp book covers.  In addition to signing his work under his own name, he produced art under a range of pseudonyms, including ENEG ("Gene" spelled backwards), Van Rod, and Bondy.

Early life

Born in Los Angeles in 1923, Bilbrew's first career was as a vocal group singer, performing with The Mellow Tones and the Basin Street Boys. 

Pérez Seves asserted that Bilbrew illustrated or produced the storyline for a comic strip series named The Bronze Bomber, which he attributed in error to the African-American newspaper, Los Angeles Sentinel. In fact, the Bronze Bomber appeared in the Los Angeles Tribune, a different African-American newspaper, under the by-line of William Alexander. One printed page showing the Bomber cartoon from March 8, 1943, was repurposed by artist Mildred Howard as the base layer of her collage Millenials & XYZ #IV (2014), which is in the permanent collection of the Jordan Schnitzer Family Foundation. Four of the six panels are partly or wholly obscured by other elements of the collage. The upper three panels show the source and style. The Tribune began publication in 1941, but the earliest microfilm copies begin in September 1943, and the Bomber does not appear there. By early 1944, Alexander was in the Army. During 1941–1944, March 8 was a Monday only in 1943. Bilbrew was then 19 years old.

Career

Starting in 1950, Bilbrew switched from singing to illustrative art. His first professional art job was for the hugely influential comics artist Will Eisner, on The Spirit, where Bilbrew took over the back-up series Clifford—a humor page for small children—after its originator Jules Feiffer was drafted into the army. Bilbrew's Clifford was syndicated as a weekly comic strip by General Features from 1951 to 1952. 

The start of Bilbrew's "bizarre art" career came in 1951 through underground artist and pioneer Eric Stanton, whom Bilbrew met while attending Cartoonists and Illustrators School.  From then on, Bilbrew focused on fetish art, producing work for notable underground publishers Irving Klaw, Edward Mishkin, Stanley Malkin, and the Sturman brothers. He also notably produced many illustrations and covers for Leonard Burtman, publisher of Exotique, a fetish magazine published between 1955 and 1959.

Death
While his career waned with the coming of relaxed censorship laws of the 1960s, his substance abuse worsened in the early 1970s. According to Eric Stanton, Gene Bilbrew died in the back of a Times Square adult bookstore in May 1974.

Other
In 2019, the National Leather Association International established an award named after Bilbrew for creators of animated erotic art.

See also 
 Exotique (fetish magazine)
 Fetish art
 Fetish artist
 Charles Guyette
 Irving Klaw
 Bettie Page
 Eric Stanton
 John Willie

References

Further reading 
 GENE BILBREW REVEALED: The Unsung Legacy of a Fetish Art Pioneer by Richard Pérez Seves. New York, Fethistory, 2019. 
 Eric Stanton & the History of the Bizarre Underground by Richard Pérez Seves. Atglen, Schiffer Publishing, 2018.

External links 

 
 Material related to Bilbrew at the Internet Archive
http://dulltooldimbulb.blogspot.com/2009/03/eugene-bilbrew-african-american-artist.html
http://hyperallergic.com/172180/a-long-lost-artist-of-the-1950s-sexual-underground/
https://www.theguardian.com/artanddesign/2015/mar/04/cult-of-the-spankers-pulp-fiction-times-square-smut
 Gene Bilbrew, over 240 artworks stored

1923 births
1974 deaths
African-American artists
African-American comics creators
American comics creators
American erotic artists
Artists from Los Angeles
BDSM people
Fetish artists
School of Visual Arts alumni
20th-century African-American people